The Albatros B.II, (post-war company designation L.2)  was an unarmed German two-seat reconnaissance biplane of the First World War.

Design and development
Designed by Robert Thelen based on his 1913 Albatros B.I, the B.II was the aircraft that brought the aircraft manufacturer Albatros Flugzeugwerke to the world's attention (Ernst Heinkel claimed to have designed this aircraft, which is considered untrue by aviation historians).

The B.II had a shorter wingspan than the B.I and used a variety of engines up to 89 kW (120 hp). In 1914 it set an altitude record of 4,500 m (14,800 ft). The seating arrangement was not ideal; the pilot occupied the rear cockpit, the observer sat in front over the wings which greatly reduced his downward view while the protruding engine block almost completely obscured the view over the nose. When Albatros developed the armed C.I based on their B-series, the seat positions were swapped so that the observer/gunner had a better view and clear field of fire.

A floatplane variant of the B.II was developed, known as the W.1 or B.II-W, as was a purpose-built trainer with increased wingspan and different engines, designated the B.IIa.  Further developments led to the Albatros B.III, which was produced in small numbers.

Operational history
First flying in 1914, large numbers of the B.II were built and, though it was relegated from front-line service in 1915 following the introduction of the armed C-type two-seaters, the B.II remained in service as a trainer until 1918 and was still operated by the Swedish Air Force in 1919 and by the Polish Air Force during the Polish-Soviet war of 1920.  A B.II from Feldflieger Abteilung 41 was the one of the first landplanes (as opposed to Zeppelin) to drop bombs on England that caused some damage; on April 16, 1915, ten bombs were dropped by hand in the area of Sittingbourne and Faversham.  No significant damage or casualties resulted.

Service in Sweden
In 1914, the German manufacturer Albatros-Flugzeugwerke GmbH of Berlin-Johannisthal, was touring several countries in northern Europe, displaying their new aircraft, the Albatros B.IIa. At the time, it was considered one of the best primary trainer aircraft. However, the landing gear and propeller were damaged when it arrived in Sweden. Due to the outbreak of World War I, no spares could be sent, and the aircraft was interned. It was repaired and used as a trainer by the Swedish Air Force. This aircraft was later copied and manufactured in Sweden by six different aircraft companies: Svenska Aeroplanfabriken (SAF), Södertelge Werkstäder (SW), Marinens Flygväsende (MFV), Nordiska Aviatikbolaget (NAB), AB Thulinverken as the Thulin C and Flygkompaniets Verkstäder Malmen (FVM). It was the first military trainer aircraft in Sweden and received the designation Sk 1 and Ö2 in the Swedish Air Force (the two types differed slightly, mainly by choice of engine). An FVM-built Sk 1 Albatros is on public display in the Swedish Air Force Museum near Linköping. The type was used until 1935. One aircraft was later sold to Finland.

Service in Finland
NAB Albatros Type 9 (and SW 20 Albatros), Type 12 and Type 17 were among the first aircraft of the Finnish Air Force. It was in use between 1918 and 1923. There were two Type 9s, and one each of the Type 12 and 17. There was also one SW 20 Albatros, which was similar to the Type 9. The Type 12 aircraft was destroyed in the ferry flight to Finland; the remains of the aircraft were found near Eckerö, Åland. Type 12 was actually a modified Curtiss Twin JN with floats made by NAB.

Austro-Hungarian service
The Albatros B.II was widely used by the K.u.K, but was given the designation Albatros B.I (series 21).

Variants
B.II
Developed from the B.I, the B.II entered production in 1914; (Company post-war designation L.2).
B.IIa
strengthened airframe, particularly the tail section and  Mercedes D.II or  Argus As III engines with radiators moved to the leading edge of the upper centre section; (Company post-war designation L.30).
B.II (Ph) series 23 Production of the B.I in Vienna by Phönix Flugzeug-Werke AG, for the Austro-Hungarian Imperial and Royal Aviation Troops.
B.II (Ph) series 24 Production of the B.I in Vienna by Phönix Flugzeug-Werke AG, for the Austro-Hungarian Imperial and Royal Aviation Troops.
W.1
Seaplane with twin floats and a  Benz Bz.III engine.
Thulin C Licence built version by AB Thulinverken

Operators

Luftstreitkräfte
Kaiserliche Marine

Austro-Hungarian Imperial and Royal Aviation Troops

Bulgarian Air Force operated this type to 1918

Finnish Air Force operated three aircraft (two NAB 9, one SW 20) in 1918-20

Latvian Air Force

Lithuanian Air Force operated six aircraft postwar
Air Club of Lithuania from 1929 until late 1930s used one ex-military Albatros B.II 

Ottoman Air Force

Polish Air Force operated 116 B.IIs and B.IIas between 1918 and 1927. A dozen or so remained within civil aviation until 1937.

Swedish Air Force operated 47 aircraft postwar (Sk 1/Ö2).
Swedish Navy operated five aircraft between 1920 and 1929.

Royal Naval Air Service, Royal Flying Corps, Royal Air Force operated one aircraft from August 1914 - February 1918.

Specifications (B.II with Mercedes D.II engine)

See also

References

Bibliography

Biplanes
Single-engined tractor aircraft
1910s German military reconnaissance aircraft
1910s German military trainer aircraft
Military aircraft of World War I
B.II
Aircraft first flown in 1914